AT&T Cybersecurity is a developer of commercial and open-source services to manage cyber attacks, including the Open Threat Exchange, a crowd-sourced computer-security platform.  In April 2015, the company claimed it had 26,000 participants who contributed more than one million threat indicators daily. The company has raised $120 million since it was founded as AlienVault in 2007. On July 10, 2018, it was acquired by AT&T Communications, becoming a wholly-owned subsidiary when the transaction was completed on August 22, 2018. In February 2019, AlienVault was renamed AT&T Cybersecurity.

History

The OSSIM project began in 2003 by Dominique Karg, Julio Casal, Ignacio Cabrera, and Alberto Román. It became the basis of AlienVault, founded in 2007 in Madrid, Spain.

The company hired the management team of Hewlett-Packard's Fortify group in 2012, including AlienVault CEO Barmak Meftah, CTO Roger Thornton, and five others.

In 2015, the company partnered with Intel to coordinate real-time threat information. A similar deal was announced the same year with Hewlett-Packard.

In 2015, AlienVault researchers released a study disclosing that Chinese hackers were circumventing popular privacy tools.

AlienVault Open Threat Exchange had 26,000 participants in 140 countries reporting more than one million potential threats daily, as of June 2015. 

In February 2017, AlienVault released USM Anywhere, a SaaS security monitoring platform designed to centralize threat detection, incident response, and compliance management of cloud, hybrid cloud, and on-premises environments from a cloud-based console.

By July 2017, AlienVault Open Threat Exchange platform had 65,000 participants who contributed more than 14 million threat indicators daily.

It was reported in 2018 that AlienVault had raised around $120 million since its inception. On July 10, 2018, AT&T announced to acquire AlienVault for an undisclosed amount. The acquisition was completed on August 22, 2018, and the company became a subsidiary of AT&T through its communications unit.

On February 26, 2019, AlienVault was renamed AT&T Cybersecurity.

Products
AT&T Cybersecurity offers a paid security platform, called Unified Security Management, that integrates threat detection, incident response, and compliance management into one application. Threat applications are offered via hardware, virtual machines, and as a cloud service. Other services that AT&T provides include network vulnerability scanning, vulnerability assessment, and vulnerability management. The Open Threat Exchange (OTX) allows security experts to research and collaborate on threats, compare data, and integrate threat information into their security systems. A big data platform, OTX uses natural language processing and machine learning.

AT&T Cybersecurity also runs the Open Source Security Information Management (OSSIM) project, which provides computer security, intrusion detection, and response services.

Finances
In August 2015, the firm raised $52 million to expand its security business. The round was led by Institutional Venture Partners and included GGV Capital, Kleiner Perkins, Trident Capital, and Jackson Square Ventures.

The company added 300 to 400 new clients each quarter, and it hired a Chief Financial Officer to help it prepare for a possible initial public offering (IPO).

By the end of the fiscal year 2016, AlienVault recorded about 53 percent year-over-year sales growth and increased its install base by about 65 percent to approximately 5,000 commercial customers.

Awards

 Forbes featured AlienVault in their Forbes Cloud 100 list in 2016.
 Deloitte featured AlienVault in their Deloitte Technology Fast 500 list in 2015 and 2016.
 In 2015, AlienVault won the "Advanced Persistent Threat (APT) Solution of the Year" presented by The Computing Security Awards.

Competitors
AlienVault competes in the SIEM and network security industry against Microfocus ArcSight, IBM QRadar and LogRhythm, among others.

References

AT&T subsidiaries
Companies based in San Mateo, California
Software companies of the United States
Software companies established in 2007
Computer security companies
Security compliance
2018 mergers and acquisitions